Bright Nights Dark Days is Cavo's first major label (and second studio) album, released on August 11, 2009 on Reprise Records. It debuted at No. 47 on the Billboard 200.

Track listing

Charts

References

2009 albums
Cavo albums
Reprise Records albums
Albums produced by David Bendeth